E. Curtis Topliff (1829/30–1895) was an American businessman and politician.

Life 
Topliff was born in 1829 or 1830 to some of the first settlers of Chautauqua County, New York. While his family was relatively poor, Topliff was ambitious and went to Jamestown to study law. It was around this time when the California Gold Rush began, and so Topliff ceased his studies to travel west in 1851. He spent three years there, and then traveled to Chile to mine for silver. Upon returning home, he started a lumber business. During this time, he was a member of the Democratic Party, but became a Republican in 1854 due to new territorial policies. In 1863, he was elected supervisor of Salamanca and was reelected twice. It was in 1865 that he became a member of the New York State Assembly. He died in 1895 and is buried along with his wife, Frances, in Conewango.

References 

1895 deaths
Republican Party members of the New York State Assembly
19th-century American politicians
Year of birth uncertain